Mirzəbəyli (also, Mirzabeyli) is a village and municipality in the Qabala Rayon of Azerbaijan.  It has a population of 2,381.  The municipality consists of the villages of Mirzəbəyli və Corlu.

References 

Populated places in Qabala District